Pravin Naik (born 3 January 1937) is a politician from Indian State of Gujarat. He belongs to the Bharatiya Janata Party.

He represented Gujarat State in Rajya Sabha, the Council of States of India parliament, from 2010 to 2011.

He was elected in bye-election after the death of sitting member Suryakantbhai Acharya. He was Councillor in Surat Municipal Corporation.

References

Rajya Sabha members from Gujarat
Ahmedabad municipal councillors
People from Surat
1937 births
Living people
Bharatiya Janata Party politicians from Gujarat